Elizabeth Salmón is a Peruvian legal scholar and the current UN Special Rapporteur on the situation of human rights in the Democratic People's Republic of Korea. She was appointed in August 2022 by the OHCHR, replacing Tomás Ojea Quintana.

Background 
Elizabeth Silvia Salmón Gárate was born in Lima, Peru in 1966. She received her law degree in 1990 from the Pontifical Catholic University of Peru (PUCP). Shortly after, she attended the University of Seville in Spain, from which she obtained her Doctorate in International Law in 1996. She is currently a tenured Professor of International Law at PUCP.

Notes

References 

1966 births
Living people
Peruvian officials of the United Nations
United Nations special rapporteurs